The table below lists the decisions (known as reasons) delivered from the bench by the Supreme Court of Canada during 2021. The table illustrates what reasons were filed by each justice in each case, and which justices joined each reason.

Reasons

Notes and references

Notes

References

External links 
 2021 decisions: CanLII, LexUM

Supreme Court of Canada reasons by year